Executive Order 13491 is an Executive Order issued on January 22, 2009, by United States President Barack Obama ordering compliance with US domestic law, and its international agreements, in its treatment of captives.
The full title of the order is: Executive Order 13491 – Ensuring Lawful Interrogations.

As part of this order Obama rescinded Executive Order 13440.

References

Executive orders of Barack Obama
Interrogation techniques